Trijn is a Dutch female given name, related to the French name Catherine. The diminutive is Trijntje. Notable people with the Dutch name include:

People 
 Trijntje Keever (1616-1633), tallest female person
 Trijn van Leemput (1530–1607), Dutch heroine
 Trijntje Oosterhuis (1973), Dutch singer
 Trijn Rembrands (1557–1638), Dutch heroine
 Trijnie Rep (1950) Dutch speed-skater

Fictional characters 

 Trijn de Begijn, title character in the homonymous opera by Alphonse Olterdissen

Dutch feminine given names
Lists of people by given name